Marcel Rainaud (1 April 1940 – 10 April 2020) was a member of the Senate of France, representing the Aude department as a member of the Socialist Party.

He entered the Senate in August 2006, following the death of Raymond Courrière.  Before serving in the Senate, he was a Municipal Councillor, and Mayor of the Commune of Talairan.

References

Page on the Senate website

1940 births
2020 deaths
French Senators of the Fifth Republic
Socialist Party (France) politicians
Senators of Aude